John Suckling may refer to:

Sir John Suckling (politician) (1569–1627), of Roos Hall, Suffolk
Sir John Suckling (poet) (1609–1642), English poet